Lobizon is a genus of spiders in the family Lycosidae. It was first described in 2009 by Piacentini & Grismado. , it contains 5 species, all from Argentina.

References

Lycosidae
Araneomorphae genera
Spiders of Argentina